Umbilicaric acid is an organic polyphenolic carboxylic acid made by several species of lichen. It is named after Umbilicaria. Umbilicaric acid is a tridepside, containing three phenol rings.

Identification of unbilicaric acid can be important in the identification of lichen species.

See also
 Gyrophoric acid

References

Polyphenols
Benzoic acids
Benzoate esters